Rosen Rosenov Kolev (born 4 July 1990) is a Bulgarian former professional footballer who played as a defender.

Career

Early career
Kolev started to play football in CSKA Sofia's youth teams. In June 2007, English side Reading officially invited Rosen to join the training sessions of their U-19 team for one week.

Kolev's professional career started in 2008 but during that season he didn't make an appearance for the first team and in January 2010 was sent on loan to B PFG side Bdin Vidin. Rosen made his debut for Bdin on 27 February 2010 in a 1–2 away loss against Balkan Botevgrad.

Kom-Minyor
In June 2010 his contract with CSKA was mutually terminated and Kolev joined Kom-Minyor. He made his Kom-Minyor début on 31 July 2010 in the away game versus Chavdar Byala Slatina. Kolev got his first goal on 11 September, in a 2–2 home draw against Septemvri Simitli. On 2 October he scored his 2nd League goal of the season against Vihren Sandanski in a 1–0 win. He continued his scoring in the season by scoring Kom-Minyor's second goal in a 2–0 win against Botev Krivodol of the Bulgarian Cup on 20 November.

Botev Plovdiv
Kolev joined Botev Plovdiv on 11 July 2014. Nine days later, on 20 July, he made his debut during the 1–0 win over Lokomotiv Sofia. Kolev did not play in any official games in 2015 and on 25 May his contract with Botev was mutually terminated. Kolev left the team after playing in 11 games.

Peagsus
On 28 July 2017, Pegasus announced that they had signed Kolev.

On 8 July 2019, it was revealed that Kolev had left the club.

Statistics

References

1990 births
Living people
Bulgarian footballers
OFC Bdin Vidin players
PFC Kom-Minyor players
PFC Cherno More Varna players
FC Lyubimets players
Botev Plovdiv players
FC Volga Nizhny Novgorod players
FC Yenisey Krasnoyarsk players
TSW Pegasus FC players
FC Dunav Ruse players
Bulgarian expatriate footballers
Expatriate footballers in Russia
Expatriate footballers in Hong Kong
Association football defenders
First Professional Football League (Bulgaria) players
Hong Kong Premier League players
Hong Kong League XI representative players